José Sardá (1902 – death date unknown) was a Cuban pitcher in the Negro leagues in the 1930s.

A native of Havana, Cuba, Sardá played for the Cuban Stars (East) in 1935. In six recorded games on the mound, he posted a 2.87 ERA over 37.2 innings.

References

External links
Baseball statistics and player information from Baseball-Reference Black Baseball Stats and Seamheads

1902 births
Date of birth missing
Year of death missing
Place of death missing
Cuban Stars (East) players
Baseball players from Havana
Baseball pitchers